Lumberton Municipal Airport  is a city-owned, public-use airport located three nautical miles (6 km) west of the central business district of Lumberton, a city in Robeson County, North Carolina, United States. It is included in the National Plan of Integrated Airport Systems for 2011–2015, which categorized it as a general aviation facility.

Facilities and aircraft 
Lumberton Municipal Airport covers an area of 485 acres (196 ha) at an elevation of 125 feet (38 m) above mean sea level. It has two runways with asphalt surfaces: 5/23 is 5,502 by 150 feet (1,677 x 46 m) and 13/31 is 5,003 by 150 feet (1,525 x 46 m).

For the 12-month period ending May 18, 2011, the airport had 25,000 aircraft operations, an average of 68 per day: 88% general aviation, 8% military, and 4% air taxi. At that time there were 46 aircraft based at this airport: 85% single-engine, 6.5% multi-engine, 6.5% ultralight, and 2% helicopter.

References

External links 
 Lumberton Municipal Airport, official website
  at North Carolina DOT airport guide
 Aerial image as of February 1999 from USGS The National Map
 

Airports in North Carolina
Transportation in Robeson County, North Carolina
Buildings and structures in Robeson County, North Carolina